Laverick is a surname. Notable people with the surname include:

Bill Laverick, English footballer
Bobby Laverick  (born 1938), English footballer
Elise Laverick (born 1975), British rower
Elizabeth Laverick (1925-2010), British engineer
June Laverick (born 1931), English actress
Mick Laverick (born 1954),  English footballer